Gilia brecciarum is an annual flowering plant in the phlox family (Polemoniaceae), known by the common name Nevada gilia or break gilia.

Range and habitat 
It is native to the western United States from California and Oregon to Nevada, where it grows in open areas in sandy soils, such as desert, plateau, and dry mountain slopes.

Growth pattern
This is a spindly wildflower with thin, branching stems reaching 10 to 40 centimeters in maximum height.

Leaves and stems
The leaves are made up of multilobed leaflets usually straight and with rounded ends. 
The stems and foliage are shiny green and covered in cobweb-like fibers, particularly on the lower stem. The herbage has an unpleasant skunklike scent.

Flowers and fruit
Flowers appear in small clustered inflorescences at the ends of the stem branches. Each is on a pedicel covered in hairlike black glands. The glandular flower has a small throat opening into a flat-faced pinkish-lavender corolla with five protruding purple-anthered stamens. The center of the flower and throat may have purple and yellow blotches. The fruit is an egg-shaped capsule about half a centimeter long.

References

External links
Jepson Manual Treatment
Photo gallery

brecciarum
Flora of Nevada
Flora of Oregon
Flora of California
Flora of the Sierra Nevada (United States)
Flora of the California desert regions
Flora without expected TNC conservation status